Zen Café is a Finnish rock band that was founded in Turku in 1992. The band derived its name from the book Zen and the Art of Motorcycle Maintenance by Robert M. Pirsig at the suggestion of band's bassist Kari Nylander. Other original members were Samuli Putro (vocals, guitar), Mikko Oesch (guitar) and Tuomo Mäkipaavola (drums). Oesch soon left the group and Mäkipaavola was replaced by Pete Parkkonen (drums). Their latest album Stop was released in 2006, after which the band began a long hiatus without officially disbanding.

Meanwhile, band members are following their own personal projects. Lead vocalist Samuli Putro has released four solo albums, an EP, and a number of singles. Two of his albums have topped the Finnish albums chart.

Members
Current line-up
 Samuli Putro – vocals, guitar, lyrics
 Kari Nylander – bass
 Pete Parkkonen – drums

Past members
 Mikko Oesch – guitar, vocals
 Tuomo Mäkipaavola – drums

Current member biographies

Samuli Putro

Samuli Tapani Putro (born in Helsinki on 21 August 1970) is a Finnish musician, vocalist and songwriter. His family moved to live in Raahe, Turku a short time after his birth. He was a founding member of Zen Café and its lead singer, guitarist and songwriter. Even while the band was very active, he pursued some personal projects including a solo EP released on 7 September 2004 titled Täysikasvuinen containing music from film soundtracks.

When the band went on a hiatus after 2006, he focused on developing a solo career. On 11 February 2009, he released his first solo studio album Elämä on juhla. In 2009, Putro composed the music for Mika Ronkainen's documentary film Freetime Machos. His second solo album, Älä sammu aurinko appeared on 16 March 2011 followed by Tavalliset hautajaiset on 24 August 2012. His most recent album Taitekohdassa was released in 2014.

Samuli Putro was nominated for a Jussi Award for "Best Music" for his work in Menolippu Mombasaan (One-way ticket to Mombasa) in 2003.

In 2010 he was nominated for three awards during the Emma-gaala for his 2009 album Elämä on juhla. These were for "best debut album", "Best solo act" and "critics choice".

Kari Nylander
Kari Michael Nylander (born in Suomussalmi in 1971) is a Finnish musician, and the bass player in Zen Café bassist. He spent part of his childhood and youth in Raahe. In 1989, he moved to Raahe in Turku, and was a founding member of the band.

Pete Parkkonen
Pete Parkkonen (born in Helsinki on November 4, 1964) is a Finnish drummer in Zen Café. Prior to becoming a founding member of the band, he had been in Kebas during the 1980s, in Toni Rossi's Sinitaivas-orchestra and in Inkvisitio whose debut album Paratiisi was released in 1989. In addition to the drums, Parkkonen plays percussion. Both his brothers Tom and Jussi are well-known drummers as well.

Discography

Albums

Singles

Discography: Samuli Putro 

Albums

EPs

Singles

Featured in

See also
 List of best-selling music artists in Finland

References

Finnish musical groups
Musical groups from Turku